Evropeites is an extinct genus of trilobite in the family Pliomeridae. There is one described species in Evropeites, E. hyperboreus.

References

Pliomeridae
Articles created by Qbugbot